Sir Stanley Vernon Goodall, KCB, OBE (18 April 1883 – 24 February 1965) was a British naval architect. A member of the Royal Corps of Naval Constructors, he was Director of Naval Construction from 1936 to 1944.

References 

 https://www.icevirtuallibrary.com/doi/abs/10.1680/iicep.1966.8872
 http://www.dreadnoughtproject.org/tfs/index.php/Stanley_Vernon_Goodall

External links 

 

1883 births
1965 deaths
Knights Commander of the Order of the Bath
Officers of the Order of the British Empire
British naval architects